Christmas: Live From Phoenix (sometimes stylized as Christmas - Live From Phoenix, Christmas | Live From Phoenix, or A for KING & COUNTRY Christmas | LIVE From Phoenix) is the first live album and third album overall by For King & Country, an Australian-American Christian pop duo consisting of brothers Luke and Joel Smallbone, released via Word Entertainment on 27 October 2017. The album features the band playing cover versions of popular Christmas tunes and original material. It features an appearance from Rebecca St. James, who joined the band for live rendition of "The Proof of Your Love". For King & Country collaborated with Blake Kanicka, Seth Mosley and Tedd Tjornhom in the arrangement of the album.

Recording
The album was recorded in Phoenix, Arizona at Grand Canyon University Arena on the final night of the band's 2016 Christmas tour.

Touring
Throughout November and December 2016 the band embarked on a 15-date tour under the name "A for KING & COUNTRY Christmas".

Critical reception

Christmas: Live from Phoenix prompted positive reactions, echoed in reviews about the collection from critics within the Contemporary Christian music genre. Alex Caldwell from Jesus Freak Hideout described the album as a story that was "deserving a musical soundtrack" filled with warm feelings and nostalgia. He praised the band's original Christmas songs like "Baby Boy" and "Glorious" for their "seamless fit into the concert flow".

Commercial performance
In the United States, Christmas: Live from Phoenix debuted at No. 194 on the mainstream Billboard 200 chart dated 30 December 2017. The album debuted at No. 5 on Billboard's Christian Albums chart on 9 December 2017, was also the twenty-second best-selling digital release in the country that same week.

Track listing

Charts

References

2017 albums
For King & Country (band) albums